The 2022–23 Melbourne Renegades season will be the twelfth in the club's history. Coached by David Saker and captained by Nic Maddinson, they  competed in the BBL's 2022–23 season.

Summary

Squad information

Playing squad

The current squad of the Melbourne Renegades for the 2022–23 Big Bash League season as of 16 January 2023.
 Players with international caps are listed in bold.
  denotes a player who is currently unavailable for selection.
  denotes a player who is unavailable for rest of the season.

Administration and support staff
The current administration and support staff of the Melbourne Renegades for the 2022–23 Big Bash League season as of 6 December 2022.

Squad changes

Pre-season

Regular season

League table

Result by round

Matches

Play-offs

Bracket

Matches

Season statistics

Most runs

Most wickets

Attendances

  denotes home matches.

Notes

References

External links
 Official website of the Melbourne Renegades
 Official website of the Big Bash League

Melbourne Renegades seasons
2022–23 Australian cricket season